The 2000–01 New Jersey Nets season was the Nets' 34th season in the National Basketball Association, and 25th season in East Rutherford, New Jersey. The Nets won the Draft Lottery and selected Kenyon Martin from the University of Cincinnati with the first overall pick in the 2000 NBA draft, and signed free agents Aaron Williams, and rookie guard Stephen Jackson during the off-season. Under new head coach Byron Scott, the Nets got off to a 6–4 start, but then lost nine consecutive games while losing 17 of their next 20 games. Keith Van Horn only played just 49 games due to a leg injury, and Kendall Gill only played just 31 games due to tendinitis in his right knee, while Kerry Kittles missed the entire season with a knee injury. The Nets lost their final six games finishing sixth in the Atlantic Division with a 26–56 record.

Stephon Marbury averaged 23.9 points and 7.6 assists per game, and was selected for the 2001 NBA All-Star Game, while Van Horn averaged 17.0 points and 7.1 rebounds per game, and Martin provided the team with 12.0 points, 7.4 rebounds and 1.7 blocks per game, finished in second place in Rookie of the Year voting, and was named to the NBA All-Rookie First Team. In addition, sixth man Johnny Newman contributed 10.9 points per game off the bench, while Williams provided with 10.2 points, 7.2 rebounds and 1.4 blocks per game also off the bench, Lucious Harris contributed 9.4 points per game, Gill averaged 9.1 points and 1.5 steals per game, and Jackson contributed 8.2 points per game.

Following the season, Marbury was traded along with Newman to the Phoenix Suns, while Gill signed with the Miami Heat, Jackson signed with the San Antonio Spurs, and Sherman Douglas retired. For this season, the Nets slightly changed their grey alternate road uniforms, which remained in use until 2003.

Offseason

Draft picks

Roster

Roster notes
 Shooting guard Kerry Kittles missed the entire season due to a knee injury.

Regular season

Season standings

z – clinched division title
y – clinched division title
x – clinched playoff spot

Record vs. opponents

Game log

Player statistics

Regular season

|-
|Stephon Marbury
|67
|67
|38.2
|.441
|.328
|.790
|3.1
|7.6
|1.2
|0.1
|23.9
|-
|Keith Van Horn
|49
|47
|35.4
|.435
|.382
|.806
|7.1
|1.7
|0.8
|0.4
|17.0
|-
|Kenyon Martin
|68
|68
|33.4
|.445
|.091
|.630
|7.4
|1.9
|1.1
|1.7
|12.0
|-
|Johnny Newman
|82
|17
|25.0
|.419
|.335
|.855
|2.1
|1.4
|0.8
|0.1
|10.9
|-
|Aaron Williams
|82
|25
|28.5
|.457
|.000
|.787
|7.2
|1.1
|0.7
|1.4
|10.2
|-
|Lucious Harris
|73
|50
|28.4
|.425
|.348
|.770
|3.9
|1.8
|1.0
|0.2
|9.4
|-
|Kendall Gill
|31
|26
|28.8
|.331
|.286
|.722
|4.2
|2.8
|1.5
|0.2
|9.1
|-
|Stephen Jackson
|77
|40
|21.6
|.425
|.335
|.719
|2.7
|1.8
|1.1
|0.2
|8.2
|-
|Doug Overton
|12
|9
|26.3
|.376
|.313
|.600
|2.0
|4.4
|0.3
|0.0
|6.9
|-
|Mark Strickland
|9
|0
|22.4
|.389
|1.000
|.727
|4.6
|0.8
|0.4
|0.3
|5.7
|-
|Sherman Douglas
|59
|7
|18.5
|.403
|.200
|.748
|1.3
|2.4
|0.6
|0.1
|5.7
|-
|Eddie Gill
|8
|0
|19.0
|.390
|.333
|.800
|1.1
|3.0
|0.5
|0.1
|4.9
|-
|Jamie Feick
|6
|0
|24.8
|.348
|
|.500
|9.3
|0.8
|1.3
|0.5
|3.7
|-
|Evan Eschmeyer
|74
|51
|18.0
|.460
|
|.657
|4.9
|0.5
|0.6
|0.8
|3.4
|-
|Vladimir Stepania
|29
|0
|9.7
|.318
|.250
|.735
|3.8
|0.6
|0.3
|0.4
|2.8
|-
|Jamel Thomas
|5
|0
|11.2
|.316
|.333
|
|1.8
|0.0
|0.6
|0.0
|2.6
|-
|Jim McIlvaine
|18
|3
|10.7
|.357
|
|.667
|1.9
|0.2
|0.4
|0.8
|1.6
|-
|Soumaila Samake
|34
|0
|6.6
|.375
|
|.417
|1.6
|0.0
|0.1
|0.4
|1.4
|-
|Kevin Ollie
|19
|0
|8.5
|.185
|
|.632
|1.2
|1.3
|0.3
|0.0
|1.2
|}

Player Statistics Citation:

Awards and records
 Kenyon Martin, NBA All-Rookie Team 1st Team

See also
 2000–01 NBA season

References

New Jersey Nets season
New Jersey Nets seasons
New Jersey Nets
New Jersey Nets
20th century in East Rutherford, New Jersey
21st century in East Rutherford, New Jersey
Meadowlands Sports Complex